Pudhumugangal Thevai is a 2012 Indian drama film directed by Manish Babu and starring Shivaji Dev, Rajesh Yadav, and Banu.

Cast 
Shivaji Dev as Anand
Rajesh Yadav as Mani
Banu as Bindutara
Vishnupriya
Delhi Ganesh
M. S. Bhaskar

Soundtrack
Soundtrack was composed by Twinz Tunes.
Karuvizhi - Haricharan, Swetha Mohan
En Uyiril - Tippu
Adicha Ghilli - Mukesh Mohamed, Senthildas, Priya Himesh
Kollywood Kanavu - Suchith Suresan, Sricharan, Achu

Release 
The Times of India gave the film a rating of two out of five stars and stated that "With no great performance from any of the actors, Puthumugangal Thevai ends up just reiterating its name". The Hindu wrote that "PT isn’t exactly slipshod. Yet, because of a story and screenplay that could have been better devised, it doesn’t appeal".

References 

Indian drama films
2012 directorial debut films
2012 films
Films about filmmaking